Parade is the third full-length album by the Japanese rock group Plastic Tree, released on August 23, 2000.

Track listing
エーテル　ETHER
ロケット　ROCKET
スライド．(Ver.2.0)　SLIDE
少女狂騒　shoujo kyousou(Girl naive) 
ベランダ．(Ver.1.0) VERANDA
空白の日 kuuhaku no hi(The blank day)
十字路 juujiro(Crossroad)
トレモロ(Ver.2.0) TREMOLO
睡眠薬 suimin yaku(A sleeping pill)
bloom 
Sink(Ver.2.0)
そしてパレードは続く soshite PARADE wa tsuzuku(And the parade continues)

2000 albums
Plastic Tree albums